Benjamin Franklin, Jr. is a 1943 Our Gang short comedy film directed by Herbert Glazer. It was the 211th Our Gang short (212th episode, 123rd talking short, 124th talking episode, and 43rd MGM produced episode) that was released.

Plot
The gang kids are upset that World War II is causing them deprivations and inconveniences. Organizing a fact-finding committee, Gang members Mickey, Froggy, Buckwheat, and Janet try to determine what to do about the present national crisis. With the help of a convenient copy of Benjamin Franklin's Poor Richard's Almanack, the kids stage a play in which they cathartically come to grips with the sacrifices indigenous to the war effort, and provide patriotic solutions to the situation.

Cast

The Gang
 Bobby Blake as Mickey
 Janet Burston as Janet
 Billy Laughlin as Froggy
 Billie Thomas as Buckwheat
 Mickey Laughlin as Happy

Additional cast
 Ernie Alexander as John, Mickey's father
 Barbara Bedford as Janet's mother
 Margaret Bert as Martha, Mickey's mother
 Vincent Graeff as Club member put in his place
 Valerie Lee as Club member complaining about Jimmy Stewart
 Frank Ward as First club member to gripe
 Dickie Hall as Club member
 Barry Downing as Extra club member
 Elana Savona as Extra club member

See also
 Our Gang filmography

References

External links

1943 films
American black-and-white films
Films directed by Herbert Glazer
Metro-Goldwyn-Mayer short films
1943 comedy films
Our Gang films
1943 short films
1940s American films